Jerome Taylor Congleton (August 25, 1876 – December 10, 1936) served as Mayor of Newark, New Jersey from 1928 to 1933.

Biography
He was born in Newark, New Jersey on August 25, 1876, the son of Joseph Norton Congleton and the former Mary Isabel Wade.

Congleton was elected as Mayor of Newark in 1928. In a wave of anti-incumbent backlash, he lost re-election.
  
On December 10, 1936, Congleton suffered a heart attack while driving his car and died. He was 60 years old.

References

External links
Biographical information for Jerome T. Congleton from The Political Graveyard

1876 births
1936 deaths
Mayors of Newark, New Jersey